Events from the year 1928 in Nicaragua.

Incumbents
President: Adolfo Díaz

Events
January 1 - Battle of Las Cruces (1928)
February 27–28 - Battle of El Bramadero
May 13–14 - Battle of La Flor
November 4 - Nicaraguan general election, 1928

Births

Deaths

 
1920s in Nicaragua
Years of the 20th century in Nicaragua